Azimut Holding is an Italian asset management company, based in Milan, Italy, with branches in Australia, Brazil, Chile, China, Egypt, Ireland, Luxembourg, Mexico, Monaco, Singapore, Switzerland, Taiwan, Turkey, United Arab Emirates and the United States. Traded on the Borsa Italiana, the company is specialized in investment management aimed at private and institutional clients. In 2016, revenues were €611 million with a net profit of €172 million. In 2017, revenues reached 811 million euros with a profit of 215 million.

References

External links

 

Companies listed on the Borsa Italiana
Companies based in Milan
Financial services companies established in 1988
Investment management companies of Italy